767 Bondia (prov. designation:  or ) is a Themis asteroid from the outer regions of the asteroid belt, approximately  in diameter. It was discovered on 23 September 1913, by American astronomer Joel Hastings Metcalf at his observatory  in Winchester, Massachusetts. The B-type asteroid has a rotation period of 8.3 hours. It was named after William Cranch Bond (1789–1859) and his son George Phillips Bond (1825–1865), both American astronomers and directors of the Harvard College Observatory in Cambridge, Massachusetts.

Orbit and classification 

Bondia is a core member the Themis family, a very large family of carbonaceous asteroids, named after 24 Themis. It orbits the Sun in the outer main-belt at a distance of 2.6–3.7 AU once every 5 years and 6 months (2,015 days; semi-major axis of 3.12 AU). Its orbit has an eccentricity of 0.18 and an inclination of 2° with respect to the ecliptic.

The body's observation arc begins at Bergedorf Observatory in September 1915, or two years after its official discovery observation by Metcalf at Winchester Observatory.

Naming 

This minor planet was named after American astronomers William Cranch Bond (1789–1859) and his son George Phillips Bond (1825–1865), both directors of the Harvard College Observatory in Cambridge, Massachusetts. Former co-discovered  and pioneered the use of photographic plates in astronomy. The latter is best known for his 1848 co-discovery of Hyperion, a moon of Saturn. He also discovered Saturn's faint C Ring, also known as Crepe Ring. The  was mentioned in The Names of the Minor Planets by Paul Herget in 1955. The lunar craters W. Bond and G. Bond were named in honor of the two American astronomers. In addition, Martian crater Bond was named after George Phillips.

Physical characteristics 

In the Bus–Binzel SMASS classification, Bondia is a B-type asteroid, a brighter variant of the common carbonaceous C-type asteroid.

Rotation period 

In October 2018, a rotational lightcurve of Bondia was obtained from photometric observations by Mexican astronomers at the National Astronomical Observatory in San Pedro Mártir (OAN-SPM). Lightcurve analysis gave a well defined rotation period of  hours with a brightness variation of  magnitude and supersedes a previous observation by Szabó from 2016, who determined a period of at least  hours and a low amplitude.

Diameter and albedo 

The Collaborative Asteroid Lightcurve Link derives an albedo of 0.0857 and a diameter of 41.40 kilometers based on an absolute magnitude of 10.2.

References

External links 
 Lightcurve Database Query (LCDB), at www.minorplanet.info
 Dictionary of Minor Planet Names, Google books
 Discovery Circumstances: Numbered Minor Planets (1)-(5000) – Minor Planet Center
 
 

000767
Discoveries by Joel Hastings Metcalf
Named minor planets
000767
19130923